Buger is an administrative ward in the Karatu district of the Arusha Region of Tanzania. According to the 2012 census, the ward has a total population of 9,919.

Three quarters  of Burger ward is a forest reserve. 

The ward has three primary schools, one dispensary and one secondary school.

Buger Ward has a small airstrip for a small plane, which is near the secondary school.

References

Karatu District
Wards of Arusha Region